Stephen Jenkins may refer to:

 Stephan Jenkins (born 1964), American musician with Third Eye Blind
 Stephen Beckett (born 1967), née Stephen Jenkins, English actor
 Chad Jenkins (Stephen Chadwick Jenkins, born 1987), pitcher for the Toronto Blue Jays
 Stephen Jenkins (footballer) (born 1980), English football player (Brentford)
 Stephen Rice Jenkins (1858–1929), physician and political figure in Prince Edward Island, Canada
 Steve Jenkins (author), (1952–2021) American children’s book author and illustrator 
 Steve Jenkins (born 1972), Welsh football player
 Steven Jenkins (born 1978), English cricketer